Sethos is the name used in ancient Greek historiography for several Egyptian pharaohs:
Seti I (1290–1279 BC), 19th dynasty
Seti II (1200/1199–1194/1193), 19th dynasty
Shebitku (714–705 BC), 25th dynasty

It may also refer to either of two temples of Sethos:
Mortuary Temple of Seti I at Qurna
Memorial Temple of Seti I at Abydos, Egypt

It may also refer to:
Life of Sethos, an 18th-century French novel based on Herodotus' account of Shebitku
5009 Sethos, a minor planet in the asteroid belt
Pinguicula × 'Sethos', a cultivar of hybrid carnivorous plant.